Alvin "Al" Ott (born June 19, 1949) was a Republican member of the Wisconsin State Assembly from Forest Junction. He represented the 3rd Assembly District from 1986 to 2017.  He served as a member of Committee on Public Safety, Committee on Agriculture, and Committee on Transportation.

References

External links
Official website
 

Republican Party members of the Wisconsin State Assembly
Living people
1949 births
Politicians from Green Bay, Wisconsin
People from Brillion, Wisconsin
21st-century American politicians